Sumsuma (1903?–1965), the leader of the Rabaul Strike of 1929 was from Sasa village on Boang Island and Tefa Island in the Tanga Islands of New Ireland Province, Papua New Guinea. He united people from all tribes to protest against the Australians in Rabaul on 29,January,1929. He was assisted by Ndramei of Manus and Kateo of Wewak.

References

1900s births
1965 deaths
People from New Ireland Province
People from Namatanai
People from Tanga Islands